The women's 400 metres event at the 1970 European Athletics Indoor Championships was held on 14 March in Vienna.

Medalists

Results

Heats
The winner of each heat (Q) and the next 1 fastest (q) qualified directly for the final.

Final

References

400 metres at the European Athletics Indoor Championships
400